John or Johnny Halligan may refer to:
John Halligan Jr. (1876–1934), U.S. admiral
John Halligan (ice hockey) (c.1942–2010), New York Rangers public relations director and NHL executive
John Halligan (politician), Irish politician from Waterford, Ireland
Johnny Halligan, Scottish footballer (Hibernian FC)